Boneh-ye Hajat (also Romanized as Boneh-ye Ḩājāt) is a village in Kheybar Rural District, Choghamish District, Dezful County, Khuzestan Province, Iran. At the 2006 census, its population was 1,062, in 194 families.

References 

Populated places in Dezful County